The Brasileiro de Marcas (Brazilian Brands) is a touring car racing series based in Brazil.

From 2011 onwards, this new Brasileiro de Marcas continued the former Campeonato Brasileiro de Marcas e Pilotos (Brazilian Championship of Brands and Drivers). which had been discontinued after 2009.

History
The Campeonato Brasileiro de Marcas e Pilotos (Brazilian Championship of Brand and Drivers) was a touring car racing based in Brazil. It had two incarnations, the first one between 1983 and 1994, and the second one between 2004 and 2009.

Start in 1983 the Campeonato Brasileiro de Marcas e Pilotos was a strong touring car racing championship, with direct involvement of the manufactures, had its last year of competition in 1994, the champions were Egon Herzfield and Vicente Daudt, who run with the Ford Escort. At the end of 1994 season, the promise was that we would have for the 1995 season imported cars, utilize in some championships as; BTCC or DTM, but this promise was not fulfilled and the championship was declared ended.

After ten years, in 2004 that announced the return of the championship with new rules and cars, organized for Toninho de Souza and Brazilian Confederation of Auto Racing (CBA), the championship not obtained success and was ended in 2009.

Brasileiro de Marcas
In 2011 was announced the return of the championship with Brasileiro de Marcas name and completely reworked. The return of the championship in 2011, organized by Vicar and participation by several teams and drivers of Stock Car Brasil, has with object, return of disputes by manufacturers in Brazil. Chevrolet, Ford and Honda officially entering and Toyota partly. Thiago Camilo won the title, Chevrolet won the Manufactures' championship and Full Time Sports the Teams' championship.

Manufacturer representation

Chevrolet
 Chevrolet Astra: 2011
 Chevrolet Cruze: 2012–
Ford
 Ford Focus: 2011–
Honda
 Honda Civic: 2011–
Mitsubishi
 Mitisubishi Lancer GT: 2012–
Renault
 Renault Fluence: 2015–
Toyota
 Toyota Corolla: 2011
 Toyota Corolla XRS: 2012–

Scoring system

Champions

Campeonato Brasileiro de Marcas e Pilotos

Brasileiro de Marcas

See also
Stock Car Brasil
TC 2000 Championship

References

External links
 

 
Auto racing series in Brazil
Touring car racing series
Recurring sporting events established in 1983
Recurring sporting events disestablished in 2009
Recurring sporting events established in 2011
Motorsport competitions in Brazil